Hasta Ahora ("Until Now") is the compilation album from Sin Bandera. It was released on December 4, 2007.

Track listing

 Entra En Mi Vida – 4:09
 Que Lloro – 4:02
 Pero No – 4:20
 Te Vi Venir – 3:15
 Sirena – 4:28
 Que Me Alcance La Vida – 3:49
 Mientes Tan Bien – 3:48
 Tócame – 4:40
 Kilómetros – 3:42
 Ves – 3:34
 Suelta Mi Mano – 4:00
 Si Tú No Estás Aquí – 3:48
 Amor Real – 4:05
 Será – 3:35
 Kilómetros (Demo)
 Y Llegaste Tú (Demo)
 Si Me Besas (Demo)
 Para Alcanzarte (Demo)

Charts

Weekly charts

Year-end charts

Sales and certifications

References

2007 compilation albums
Sin Bandera albums